Five shilling notes were first proposed in 1916, when the value of silver was estimated to become too expensive to use for making coins due to a possible decrease in Australia's supply of silver. The proposed note was designed to have a portrait of George VI, the King of the United Kingdom and Emperor of India, displayed on its front side. However, the need for paper notes did not arise, and by 1953, all the notes were destroyed, other than those now in the possession of Reserve Bank of Australia.

References

External links

Reserve Bank of Australia Museum

Banknotes of Australia